Al Wahda Football Club is an Emirati professional football club based in Abu Dhabi, that competes in the UAE Pro League. The club was founded in 1974 and plays its home games at the Al Nahyan Stadium. The club's colours are maroon, grey and white.

History

Foundation
The first team created in Abu Dhabi was Al-Ahli in 1966, followed respectively by Al-Ittihad in 1968, Al-Falah and Al-Wahda in 1969. In 1974, a decision was made by the Minister of youth and sport to create Abu Dhabi SC by merging Al-Ittihad and Al-Wahda on 13 March 1974, and to create Al-Emirates SC by merging Al-Ahli and Al-Falah on 3 June 1974. In 1984, Abu Dhabi SC and Al-Emirates SC merged to create Al-Wahda FC.

Modern era
In 1999, Al Wahda won their maiden UAE League title with 8 points ahead of their rivals Al Ain. In 2018, Al Wahda changed its official logo as part of a new club redesign.

Honours

Leagues
UAE Pro League: 4
 Champions: 1998–99, 2000–01, 2004–05, 2009–10

UAE Division One: 2
 Champions: 1976–77, 1984–85

Cups
UAE President's Cup: 2
 Champions: 1999–2000, 2016–17

UAE Super Cup: 4
 Champions: 2002, 2011, 2017, 2018

UAE Federation Cup: 3
 Champions: 1986, 1995, 2001

UAE League Cup: 2
 Champions: 2015–16, 2017–18

Performance in AFC competitions

Al Wahda has been qualifying for Asian competitions regularly since the 1998–99 Asian Cup Winners' Cup, they've been qualifying for the AFC Champions League regularly by winning the President's Cup or consistently finishing near the top in the league.

 AFC Champions League: 12 appearances

2004: Quarter-finals
2006: Group stage
2007: Semi-finals
2008: Group stage
2010: Group stage
2011: Group stage
2015: Play-offs
2017: Group stage
2018: Group stage
2019: Round of 16
2020: Withdrew
2021: Quarter-finals

 Asian Club Championship: 2 appearances
1999–2000: First round
2001–02: Group stage (Top 8)

 Asian Cup Winners Cup: 2 appearances
1998–99: First round
2000–01: First round

Home stadium

The Al-Nahyan Stadium is the home of Al Wahda. It has 15,000 seats and located only three kilometers from the downtown at the heart of Abu Dhabi City.

Current squad

Unregistered players

Out on loan

Top scorer
 205 goals:
 Sebastian Tagliabue

Coaching Staff

Past managers
{{columns-list|
  Helmy Toulan (1979–84)
  Heshmat Mohajerani (1984–86)
  Slobodan Halilović (1991–92)
  Mahmoud El-Gohary (1995–96)
  Jo Bonfrere (1998–99)
  Ruud Krol (1999)
  Dimitri Davidovic (1999–00)
  Rinus Israël (2000–01)
  Jo Bonfrere (2001–02)
  Cemşir Muratoğlu (2002–03)
  Rolf Fringer (March 14, 2003 – June 30, 2003)
  Rolland Courbis (July 1, 2003 – Nov 30, 2003)
  Rinus Israël (Dec 1, 2003 – June 30, 2004)
  Ahmad Abdel-Halim (2004–0?)
  Reiner Hollmann (July 1, 2005 – April 3, 2006)
  Richard Tardy (200?–Aug 4, 2006)
  Horst Köppel (Aug 5, 2006 – Oct 11, 2006)
  Jo Bonfrere (Dec 13, 2007 – Dec 17, 2008)
  Josef Hickersberger (Dec 10, 2008 – June 1, 2010)
  László Bölöni (May 29, 2010 – Sept 2, 2010)
  Tite (Aug 31, 2010 – Oct 19, 2010)
  Josef Hickersberger (Oct 22, 2010 – June 30, 2012)
  Branko Ivanković (May 20, 2012 – April 28, 2013)
  Josef Hickersberger (April 28, 2013 – July 15, 2013)
  Karel Jarolím (July 15, 2013 – Nov 9, 2013)
  José Peseiro (Nov 11, 2013 – Jan 11, 2015)
  Sami Al-Jaber (Jan 11, 2015 – May 19, 2015)
  Javier Aguirre (June 18, 2015 – May 20, 2017)
  Laurențiu Reghecampf (July 3, 2017 – November 25, 2018)
  Henk ten Cate (December 7, 2018 – May 26, 2019)
  Maurice Steijn (June 9, 2019 – October 17, 2019)
  Manuel Jiménez (October 17, 2019 – July 18, 2020)
  Mark Wotte (July 18, 2020 – September 8, 2020)
  Vuk Rasovic (September 8, 2020 – March 12, 2021)
  Henk ten Cate (March 13, 2021 – October 25, 2021)
  Grégory Dufrennes (October 26, 2021 – June 3, 2022)
  Carlos Carvalhal (July 1, 2022 – October 2, 2022)
  Manuel Jiménez (October 5, 2022 – March, 12 2023)

Pro-League record

Notes 2019–20 UAE football season was cancelled due to the COVID-19 pandemic in the United Arab Emirates.

Key
 Pos. = Position
 Tms. = Number of teams
 Lvl. = League

References

External links
 Official website 

 
Wahda
Association football clubs established in 1984
Sport in Abu Dhabi
Sport in the Emirate of Abu Dhabi
1984 establishments in the United Arab Emirates